Brian Ralph Quinnett (born May 30, 1966) is a retired American professional basketball player. A 6'8" small forward, Quinnett played three seasons in the National Basketball Association (NBA).

Upon graduation from Washington State University, Quinnett was selected by the New York Knicks in the second round (50th pick overall) of the 1989 NBA Draft. He played mainly for the Knicks, and also had a brief 1991–92 stint with the Dallas Mavericks (traded for center James Donaldson). His best year as a professional was during the 1990–91 season, appearing in 68 games and averaging 4.7 ppg.

After leaving the NBA, Quinnett played briefly in the Continental Basketball Association (CBA) and also overseas for Spain's CB Murcia.

External links
College & NBA stats @ basketballreference.com
Basketpedya career data

1966 births
Living people
American expatriate basketball people in Spain
American men's basketball players
Basketball players from Washington (state)
CB Murcia players
Dallas Mavericks players
Liga ACB players
New York Knicks draft picks
New York Knicks players
People from Pullman, Washington
Power forwards (basketball)
Rapid City Thrillers players
Small forwards
Tri-City Chinook players
Washington State Cougars men's basketball players
Yakima Sun Kings players